Casanova is a small unincorporated community in Fauquier County, Virginia, United States at the intersection of  Casanova Rd (VA Route 616) and Rogues Rd. It is also the location of its own post office, with the zip code 20139. It is home to The Inn at Poplar Springs. It is also home to Melrose Castle (now a private residence) which dates back to 1854.

The Casanova Historic District was listed on the National Register of Historic Places in 2005. Other listings are Melrose Castle (also known simply as Melrose) and Weston.

Notable residents
Martin Berkofsky, classical pianist and philanthropist

References

Unincorporated communities in Fauquier County, Virginia
Unincorporated communities in Virginia